Cameron Pass may refer to:

Cameron Pass (Alaska) in Alaska in the United States
Cameron Pass (Colorado) in Colorado in the United States
Cameron Pass (Washington) in Washington in the United States
Cameron Pass (Wyoming) in Wyoming in the United States